New Maryland may refer to:

 New Maryland, New Brunswick, Canada
 New Maryland Parish, New Brunswick
 New Maryland-Sunbury, a riding that elects members to the Legislative Assembly of New Brunswick, Canada